Zernek Dam is a rock-fill embankment dam on the Hoşap River, located  southeast of Van in Van Province, Turkey. It was built between 1980 and 1988 and has an installed capacity of 5 MW.

See also

List of dams and reservoirs in Turkey

References

Dams in Van Province
Hydroelectric power stations in Turkey
Rock-filled dams
Dams completed in 1998